The 1954 NSWRFL season was the forty-seventh season of the New South Wales Rugby Football League premiership competition, based in Sydney. Ten rugby league football teams from across the city competed for the J. J. Giltinan Shield during the season, which culminated in the first “mandatory” Grand Final played between South Sydney and Newtown.

Season summary
During the pre-season, Queensland and Australian international representative forward, Harold "Mick" Crocker signed a then record one-year deal for an Australian to move south and play for Sydney club Parramatta.
1954 marked the first season when a Grand Final was scheduled to determine the premiership winner. Prior to that the season victors were either the minor premiers or decided by a final that followed two semi-finals. A Grand Final was only played if the minor-premier was defeated in a semi-final or final and exercised their right to challenge via a Grand Final. Since 1954 a Grand Final has been played every year to determine the premiership winner.

This season, in a New South Wales versus England match at the Sydney Cricket Ground, referee Aub Oxford watched in disbelief the players fighting around him like street-brawlers before turning his back and walking from the field. Oxford never refereed again and the match remains the only top-level game ever abandoned in rugby league history.

Teams

Ladder

Records set in 1954
In 1954 South Sydney’s Les Brennan set the standing record for the highest number of tries in a debut season with 29. Newtown winger Ray Preston’s 34 tries remains second only to Dave Brown’s 38 in 1935 in the tally of tries scored in a season. Preston and Kevin Considine combined for fifty-six tries during the season – easily a record for a pair of club wingers.

In the last round on 21 August, Western Suburbs set a record for the highest losing score when they lost to Balmain 32–37. This was to be one of only two cases before the introduction of the 10-metre ruck rule in 1993 that a team scored over thirty points and lost the match.

Finals

Grand Final

In spite of Newtown finishing as minor premiers they hadn’t beaten South Sydney in either regular season encounter. Souths had also won their semi-final meeting 24-14. In this, the NSWRFL’s first Grand Final scheduled to determine the premiership winner, Souths were the victors. Legendary fullback Clive Churchill was outstanding setting up three of his side's five tries. The Bluebags stayed in the contest through the kicking boot of their Test  Gordon “Punchy” Clifford.

 South Sydney 23 (Tries: Cowie 2, Moir, Hawick, Dougherty. Goals: Purcell 4.)

 Newtown 15  (Tries: Narvo. Goals: Clifford 6.)

Player statistics
The following statistics are as of the conclusion of Round 18.

Top 5 point scorers

Top 5 try scorers

Top 5 goal scorers

Post-season
Following the grand final, nine players from the NSWRFL were selected in a squad of eighteen to represent Australia in the 1954 Rugby League World Cup in France.

References

External links
 Rugby League Tables - Season 1954 AFL Tables
 Whiticker, Alan  & Collis, Ian (2006) The History of Rugby League Clubs, New Holland, Sydney
Results: 1951-60 at rabbitohs.com.au
1954 J J Giltinan Shield at rleague.com
NSWRFL season 1954 at rugbyleagueproject.org

New South Wales Rugby League premiership
NSWRFL season